Vietnam Coast Guard (VCG) is the coast guard of Vietnam. VCG is purposed to perform search and rescue duties, along with their duties of combating and preventing smuggling, piracy, and trade fraud in Vietnamese waters.

Until 2013, it was a branch of Vietnam's military, the Vietnam People's Army, and falls under the management of the Vietnam Ministry of National Defence. Since August 27, 2013, it has been transferred under the direct management of the Government of Vietnam, and has also changed its name from Vietnam Marine Police (VMP) to the current Vietnam Coast Guard name. Since its creation in the late 1990s, the Vietnam Coast Guard plays an important role in maintaining sea security and protection of the exclusive economic zone (EEZ) and continental shelf boundary. It has dispatched forces in waters in overlapping areas between Vietnam and foreign countries, providing protection and assistance to local fishermen when necessary.

History
Previously, the Socialist Republic of Vietnam did not have a dedicated Coast Guard; the Navy had been used for offshore patrol and related military activity, along with the Border Patrol Directorate (Bộ Tư Lệnh Biên Phòng), which had checkpoints in estuarine and littoral areas. These bodies were equipped with small boats for short pursuit and related equipment intended for short-term security applications. All river patrol responsibility belongs to the Fluvial Police (Cục Cảnh sát giao thông đường thủy - Bureau code:C25), supervised by provincial and/or local police office (Ministry of Public Security - Bộ Công An), and sometimes to the Vietnam Customs (Hải Quan), depending on the particular geographical responsibility (fluvial or fresh water only).

In order to relieve the burden on the Navy during peacetime and protect the sovereignty and sovereign rights of Vietnam in its maritime zones in compliance with international law, the Vietnam Coast Guard is then established under the name Vietnam Marine Police and placed under Vietnam People’s Navy in 1998.

The Vietnam Coast Guard was first set up through President Tran Duc Luong's order No 3-L/CTN (7 April 1998), announcing the Ordinance on the Vietnam Marine Police, which had been accepted by The Tenth National Assembly of Vietnam on 28 March 1998.

The Vietnam Coast Guard (was still called as the Vietnam Marine Police) became independent from the Vietnam People's Navy on 1 March 2008. It has in-scope intelligence based on international exchange and co-operation with its ASEAN counterparts in smuggling and on-sea drug interdiction operations. As an organization established to fight against illegal trafficking, it was keen to start with a fresh image, equipped with adequate technology and hardware, to deploy efficiently for its various specific missions. The current organizational pattern will serve as a role model for future extended projects.

Goals
 Develop and maintain operational capability to ensure national maritime sovereignty.
 Be recognised by the nation as the guardian of maritime security.
 Become the foremost maritime security agency in South East Asia.
 Develop and improve the ability to respond to maritime search and rescue requirements throughout the area of responsibility.
 Develop and improve the ability to preserve and protect the maritime environment.
 Continually improve the organisation and operation of the agency.

Mission
In its internal waters, territorial waters, contiguous zone, exclusive economic zone and continental shelf of Vietnam, the Vietnam Coast Guard has a mission to patrol and enforce laws in accordance with those of Vietnam and international treaties concerned. Vietnam is a contracting member on agreements (such as the United Nations Convention on the Law of the Sea (UNCLOS)) on defending sovereignty, jurisdiction, protection of natural resources, prevention of environmental pollution; detecting, preventing and combating acts of smuggling; piracy, trafficking, and transporting illegal narcotics. Besides, the Vietnam Coast Guard has a mission to patrol all the seas in the Southeast Asia region to protect freedom of navigation on the seas.

The Vietnam Coast Guard is responsible in co-operating with functional agencies to complete its mission. If any incident happens at sea, the Vietnam Coast Guard has the responsibility to inform to the functional agencies and co-ordinate with foreign countries to settle the issue. Lt. General Phạm Đức Lĩnh said in The 7th Heads of Asia Coast Guard Agencies Meeting (HACGAM - 7) in July 2011: "The Vietnam Coast Guard is used in overlapping sea areas between Vietnam and foreign countries. Local fishermen will be better protected and assisted if necessary, and we will remind local fishermen not to cross into the waters of foreign countries." In October 2013 the VCG were transferred from the navy to the coast guard, apparently so as to qualify for Japanese equipment aid.

The Vietnam Coast Guard is responsible for protecting the security of Vietnam's coast line and deals with problems like:
 Drug smuggling
 Human trafficking
 Counter-terrorism
 Industrial radioactive and toxic waste dumping
 Marine Environmental Protection
 Surveillance of Illegal Operations by Foreign Fishing Vessels
 Vietnam maritime law enforcement
 Marine assistance
 International Affairs
 Search and rescue (SAR)
 National defence - alongside the Vietnam People's Navy

In addition to its role, the Vietnam Coast Guard has moved their headquarters from Haiphong to Hanoi in February 2008, due to current needs to address these tasks. Current headquarters are located at 94 Le Loi Street, Nguyen Trai ward, Ha Dong district, Hanoi. Their training base and logistic support facilities remain in Haiphong.

Establishment

Organizational system
1. Coast Guard Command

2. Units in Coast Guard Department:
 Regional Coast Guard: similar with Regional Navy. In the structure of Regional Navy have fleets, flotillas and Marine police teams;
 Coast Guard fleets;
 No.1 and No.2 Reconnaissance base;
 No.1,2,3, and 4 Anti-drugs, Anti-crime Task base;
 Center of Coast Guard Information;
 Center of Coast Guard Training.

Regional Coast Guard

 1st Regional Coast Guard: managed from Ka Long River, Quang Ninh Province to Con Co island, Quang Tri Province. Based in Hai Phong;
 2nd Regional Coast Guard: managed from Con Co island, Quang Tri to Xanh islet, Binh Dinh Province and South China Sea. Based in Quang Nam Province;
 3rd Regional Coast Guard: managed from Xanh islet, Binh Dinh to Dinh An harbour, Tra Vinh Province and South China Sea. Based in Ba Ria–Vung Tau Province;
 4th Regional Coast Guard: managed from Dinh An harbour, Tra Vinh to Ha Tien, Kien Giang Province and the Gulf of Thailand. Based in Ca Mau.

International co-operation

The Vietnam Coast Guard and Philippine Coast Guard have signed an agreement to set up a hotline in principle. In the near future, both will draft detailed regulations on prompt co-ordination, if a situation at sea occurs.

On 14 July 2012, Japan's Minister for Foreign Affairs Kōichirō Genba and Vietnamese Deputy Prime Minister Pham Binh Minh had a meeting in Hanoi. The Japan Coast Guard is willing to help Vietnam bolster its coastal patrol capabilities, including setup of operations and training its personnel.

The Vietnam Coast Guard plans to be equipped with modern facilities to effectively carry out their tasks to maintain security, order, and safety in the territorial waters and exclusive economic zone with the close co-operation with regional coast guards of regional countries. To solve issues such as piracy, smuggling, trade fraud and transportation of persons, illegal drugs, disaster search and rescue, the Vietnam Coast Guard collaborates with several countries for networking exercises.

Development

A contract was signed between Vietnam and the United States for the United States Coast Guard to help train Vietnam Coast Guard beginning in 2009. The United States Coast Guard kicked off its partnership program with the Vietnam Coast Guard under the Export Control and Related Border Security program by conducting two sessions of the Maritime Law Enforcement Boarding Officer course in Hai Phong and Phu Quoc, 12–23 October 2009. This was the first United States Coast Guard engagement with the Vietnam Coast Guard under their new partnership program. Its positive results bode well for future co-operation between the two forces. The training courses received a great deal of attention from the Vietnam Coast Guard leadership, as well as the Ministry of Defence (Vietnam), with senior representatives from MOD both attending the opening and closing ceremonies, and hosting farewell lunches and dinners. The Vietnam Coast Guard leadership's recommendations for future training will not only be very useful for planning purposes, but represent clear signals that they are eager for further co-operation. Continuing the partnership plan, the United States Coast Guard has invited one VMP officer to attend the 15-week International Maritime Officer Course starting in March 2010 at the United States Coast Guard Training Center in Yorktown, Virginia.

The Vietnam Coast Guard has also cooperated with the Dutch Damen Group to build large vessels under Dutch license in Vietnam by companies including Song Thu company and 189 company. Vessels that have been completed include one offshore patrol vessel (9014), one hydrographic survey vessel (6613), and four salvage tugs.

In 2008, the Vietnam Coast Guard received three ocean sentry CASA C-212 Aviocar - Series 400 turboprop aircraft equipped with MSS 6000 systems from Airbus Military.

The Vietnamese government has planned to invest in upgrading facilities for the force, including modern ships which can operate in bad weather and stay for longer periods at sea. Furthermore, the force is also equipped with helicopters to enhance its operations at the border of the continental shelf and exclusive economic zone of Vietnam to protect its territorial waters and Vietnamese fishermen. This is especially important with the ongoing disputes over sovereignty in and around Vietnamese waters.

Equipment

The Vietnam Coast Guard's vessels are equipped with specialised functions (almost all Vietnam Coast Guard's vessels are self-produced):
 To engage in coastal patrol and protection, using vessels from 120 to 400 tons, numbered beginning with 00, 10, 20, 30, and so on;
 To support search and rescue, using vessels from 1000 to 2000 tons, numbered beginning with 600 numbers;
 To conduct offshore patrols, using vessels over 2500 tons with helicopters on deck, numbered beginning with 800 numbers;
 To conduct search and rescue operations, using vessels designated with SAR or 900 numbers.

Almost all of the Vietnam Coast Guard's vessels start with the naming designation CSB (abbreviated by Vietnamese words: Cảnh Sát Biển - Coast Guard).

Table of Ranks

Commissioned officer ranks
The rank insignia of commissioned officers.

Other ranks
The rank insignia of non-commissioned officers and enlisted personnel.

See also
 Vietnam People's Army
 Vietnam People's Navy
 Vietnam People's Public Security
 Vietnam Fisheries Resources Surveillance

References

External links
 
  

Coast guards
M
M